Gennes-Val-de-Loire (literally Gennes-Valley of Loire) is a commune in the Maine-et-Loire department of western France. The municipality was established on 1 January 2016 by merger the former communes of Gennes, Chênehutte-Trèves-Cunault, Grézillé, Saint-Georges-des-Sept-Voies and Le Thoureil. On 1 January 2018, the former communes of Les Rosiers-sur-Loire and Saint-Martin-de-la-Place were merged into it.

Population
The population data given in the table below refer to the commune of Gennes-Val-de-Loire in its geography as of January 2020.

See also 
Communes of the Maine-et-Loire department

References 

Communes of Maine-et-Loire
States and territories established in 2016
2016 establishments in France
Andes (Andecavi)